Jitka Babická, married surname: Potůčková, (born 31 July 1939) is a Czech former ice dancer who represented Czechoslovakia. Competing in partnership with Jaromír Holan, she won bronze at the 1966 European Championships in Bratislava, Czechoslovakia.

Competitive highlights 
With Jaromír Holan

References 

1939 births
Czechoslovak female ice dancers
European Figure Skating Championships medalists
Figure skaters from Prague
Living people